Oleh Shamshur (birth: July 6, 1956, Kyiv, Ukraine) is a Ukrainian diplomat. Ambassador of Ukraine to the United States (2005-2010). Ambassador Extraordinary and Plenipotentiary of Ukraine to France (2014-2020). Permanent Representative of Ukraine to UNESCO (2014-2020).

Education 
Oleh Shamshur graduated from Taras Shevchenko National University of Kyiv in 1978 specializing in international relations. He received his Ph.D. in History from Kyiv University (1982). Speaks fluently English and French.

Career 
Oleh Shamshur in 1978 started his professional career at the Academy of Sciences of Ukraine where he worked at the Institutes of Social and Economic Problems of Foreign Countries and World Economy and International Relations. In 1984-1989 as Director of Programs of ISCPFC. In 1992, he was a researcher at University College London.

Prior to his appointment as Ukraine's Ambassador to France Oleh Shamshur was serving as a Senior Advisor to PBN Hill and Knowlton Strategies, as a non-resident fellow at the German Marshall Fund of the United States and as a Senior Advisor to the U.S.-Ukraine Business Council.

Author publications 
Oleh Shamshur is the author of over 80 publications on ethnic relations, international migration and foreign policy.

References

External links
 Oleh SHAMSHUR: “Statements made by Biden in Kyiv are important, but the time of warnings and deadlines is over”
 DR. OLEG SHAMSHUR
 On the move: Oleh Shamshur, PBN Company
 Amb Oleh Shamshur and Amb Lee Feinstein on Ukraine
 Ukraine's Amb. Shamshur: Risk Remains for Turmoil, Violence
 Oleg Shamshur: West can use three measures against Russia
 TRIBUTES TO UKRAINIAN FEDERATION OF AMERICA AND AMBASSADOR OLEH SHAMSHUR

Living people
1956 births
Diplomats from Kyiv
Taras Shevchenko National University of Kyiv, Institute of International Relations alumni
Ambassadors of Ukraine to the United States
Ambassadors of Ukraine to France
Permanent Delegates of Ukraine to UNESCO
Ambassadors of Ukraine to Antigua and Barbuda
Ukrainian politicians